Michael J. Murphy may refer to:
 Mike Murphy (Washington politician)
 Michael J. Murphy (builder), builder in Carmel-by-the-Sea, California
 Michael J. Murphy (diplomat), American diplomat
 Michael Joseph Murphy (1913–1996), Irish folklorist, writer and socialist
 Michael J. Murphy (police commissioner) (1913–1997), American police commissioner
 Michael John Murphy, American folk musician
 Michael Joseph Murphy (1915–2007), American prelate of the Roman Catholic Church
 Mike Murphy (Michael James Murphy), Irish broadcaster, actor and property developer
 Mike Murphy (ice hockey, born 1950) (Michael John Murphy), Canadian ice hockey player
 Mike Murphy (baseball) (Michael Jerome Murphy), American Major League Baseball catcher

See also
 Michael Murphy (disambiguation)